Andrey Gavrilov (born May 4, 1974) is a retired male butterfly swimmer from Kazakhstan. He competed in two consecutive Summer Olympics for his native country, starting in 1996 (Atlanta, Georgia). His best Olympic result was finishing in 15th place at the 1996 Summer Olympics in the Men's 4 × 100 m Medley Relay event.

External links
 
 sports-reference

1974 births
Living people
People from Temirtau
Kazakhstani male butterfly swimmers
Olympic swimmers of Kazakhstan
Swimmers at the 1996 Summer Olympics
Swimmers at the 2000 Summer Olympics
Asian Games medalists in swimming
Asian Games bronze medalists for Kazakhstan
Swimmers at the 1994 Asian Games
Swimmers at the 1998 Asian Games
Medalists at the 1994 Asian Games
Medalists at the 1998 Asian Games
Kazakhstani people of Russian descent